Édouard-Henri-Théophile Pingret (30 December 1788 in Saint-Quentin, Aisne – 1875 in Paris 8e) was a French painter and lithographer.

Life

He was born at Saint-Quentin, Aisne, the son of a middle-class family in a mainly agricultural region, but also home to the celebrated General Cambronne and to illustrious notaries and Normandy judges.  Pingret's father, Henri Pingret Jullien, was related to the highest spheres of the Protestant aristocracy, and took up the practice of law in 1781. During the French Revolution, his father was named a representative of the Department of Aisne at the Revolutionary Convention, which required him to maintain a secondary residence in the capital of France, Paris.

Pingret studied under painter Jacques-Louis David as well as Jean-Baptiste Regnault; studied also at the Academy of Saint Luke in Rome. He exhibited in Paris salons from 1810 onward. Was appointed a Chevalier of the Legion of Honor, 1831. From 1850 to 1855 he lived and worked in Mexico City, exhibiting annually at the Academia de Bellas Artes. He produced outstanding portraits, including those of Emperor Napoleon Bonaparte (1808) in France and General Mariano Arista (1851; Mexico City, Mus. N. Hist.). His most important works in Mexico were costumbrista genre scenes.  He died in his home town of Saint-Quentin.

Works
He was also an illustrator of  monographs such as "Voyage de S.M. Louis-Philippe Ier Roi des Francais au Chateau de Windsor. Dedie A S. M. Victoria, Reine d'Angleterre." Ed. Pingret, Paris and Ackermann, London, 1846. Large folio, with 25 lithographed plates, some tinted. A fine example of his portrait work can be found in the collection of the Yuko Nii Foundation in Brooklyn, New York. A painting titled Reading A Letter by Pingret is displayed at the Snite Museum of Art at Notre Dame University in South Bend, Indiana.

References

1788 births
People from Saint-Quentin, Aisne
1875 deaths
19th-century French painters
French male painters
French romantic painters
19th-century French lithographers
Chevaliers of the Légion d'honneur
19th-century French male artists